The Presidential Lodge  is the former presidential palace located at the Marina in Lagos, Nigeria. 

It was constructed during the British colonial time. 

After the federal government moved to Abuja in 1991 the palace lost its function as the new seat of the president became Aso Villa. The former residence was handed over to the Government of Lagos State in 2017.

See also 
 Iga Idunganran, residence of the Oba of Lagos
 Lagos State Governor's House

References

External links 
 https://www.youtube.com/watch?v=XZzEaTgegKs

Presidential residences
Residential buildings in Lagos
Official residences in Lagos
British colonial architecture in Nigeria